The eastern broad-toothed field mouse (Apodemus mystacinus)  is a species of rodent in the family Muridae.

Distribution

Following the classification of the Balkan population as a separate species western broad-toothed field mouse, the eastern broad-toothed field mouse sensu stricto is found in Georgia, Greece, Iran, Iraq, Israel, Jordan, Lebanon and Turkey.

References

Apodemus
Mammals described in 1877
Taxonomy articles created by Polbot